2016 in professional wrestling describes the year's events in the world of professional wrestling.

List of notable promotions 
These promotions held notable shows in 2016.

Calendar of notable shows

January

February

March

April

May

June

July

August

September

October

November

December

Cancelled events

Accomplishments and tournaments

AAA

Ring of Honor

Total Nonstop Action Wrestling

WWE

Title changes

AAA

TNA

NJPW

ROH

The Crash Lucha Libre

WWE 
  – Raw
  – SmackDown
  – NXT

Raw and SmackDown 
Following the reintroduction of the WWE brand extension in July, in which titles became exclusive to a brand and others were established as counterparts to the opposing brand's championships, Raw and SmackDown each had a world championship, a secondary championship, a women's championship, and a male tag team championship. A championship was also established for Raw's cruiserweight wrestlers.

NXT

Awards and honors

AAA Hall of Fame

Pro Wrestling Illustrated

TNA Hall of Fame

Wrestling Observer Newsletter

Wrestling Observer Newsletter Hall of Fame

Wrestling Observer Newsletter awards

WWE

WWE Hall of Fame

NXT Year-End Awards

Debuts

 January 4 
 Marika Kobashi
 Yuu
 February 13 – Mio Momono
 March 5
 Daiki Shimomura
 Nobuhiro Shimatani
 March 12 – Tequila Saya
 March 17 – Calvin Tankman
 March 20 – Alejandro
 March 30 
 Hana Kimura
 Seigo Tachibana
 April 5 – Takuya Nomura
 April 22 – H.Y.O
 May 3 – Rin Kadokura
 June 16 – Maho Kurone
 June 25 – Matsuya Uno
 October 17 – Yuki Ueno
 October 29 – Yuki Yoshioka
 November 20 – Ruaka
 December 3 – Logan James
 December 4 
 Naomi Yoshimura
 Yuni
 December 11 – Junta Miyawaki

Retirements

 Tyson Tomko (2002 – 2016)
 Cliff Compton (1998 - 2016)
 Mark Mercedes (1992-2016) 
 Mr. Pogo (March 20, 1972 – 2016)
 Daniel Bryan (December 1999 – February 8, 2016) (first retirement and became General Manager of SmackDown; on March 20, 2018, Bryan was formally cleared to return to full-time in-ring action and had his first match back at WrestleMania 34)
 The Grappler (1977-March 5, 2016) 
 Jim Neidhart (1978-March 5, 2016)
 Bobby Eaton (May 1976-March 19, 2016) 
 Maki Narumiya (March 19, 2011 – March 25, 2016)
 Sting (November 28, 1985 – April 2, 2016) (first retirement; later debuted in All Elite Wrestling in December 2020 with a match at Revolution in 2021)
 Johnny Kidd (1978 – April 5, 2016, returned to wrestle in 2019)
 Brie Bella (September 15, 2007 – April 6, 2016) (semi, return in 2018)
 Cameron (July 7, 2011 – May 6, 2016) (full inactive, returned to wrestle AEW in July 2020)
 Necro Butcher (January 2, 1998 – June 11, 2016, returned to wrestling in 2018)
 Scott Hall (October 2, 1984 – June 17, 2016)
 Karsten Beck (2006 – July 2, 2016)
 Booker T (1989 – July 30, 2016)
 Scotty 2 Hotty (1989-September 2016) (became a trainer for NXT and returned to wrestling in January 2022) 
 Sara Lee (August 25, 2015-September 30, 2016)
 Darryl Sharma (January 2002  – November 2016 )
 D-Von Dudley (1991 – December 17, 2016)
 Kouhiro Kanemura (December 20, 1990 – December 27, 2016)
 Rabbit Miu (August 7, 2011 – December 28, 2016)

Deaths 

 January 9 – Bob Leonard, 74
 January 10 – The Wolfman, 80
 January 17 – Mike Sharpe, 64
 January 23 – 
 Archie Gouldie, 79
 Espectrito, 49
 January 27 – Taras Bulba, 59
 February 4 – Axl Rotten, 44
 February 10 – Tony Nardo (Moondog Spot), 51
 February 11 – Kevin Randleman, 44
 February 23 – Angel Gabriele, 59
 February 24 – Eddie Einhorn, 80
 February 25 – Mark Young, 48
 March 3 – Hayabusa, 47
 March 3 – Lord James Blears, 92
 March 10 – Mike Flowers (Moondog Puppy Love)  
March 11 - Charlie Fulton, 67        
 March 23 – Joe Garagiola, Sr., 90
 March 24 – Randal Brown, 64
 March 31 – Kris Travis, 32
 April 1 – George Cavalaris, 84
 April 7 – Blackjack Mulligan, 73
 April 12 – Balls Mahoney, 44
 April 14 – Christin Able, 32 
 April 20 – Chyna, 46
 May 6 – Billy Wicks, 84 
 May 24:
Frankie Laine, 73
Buck Kartalian, 93
 June 15 – Gypsy Joe, 82
 June 30 – Thunder, 34
 July 3 – Muhammad Ali, 74
 August 4 – Jean Antone, 73
 August 28 – Mr. Fuji, 82
 September 9 – Lord Littlebrook, 87
 September 10 – Moose Morowski, 81 
 September 16 – Don Bass, 70
 October 9 – El Mongol, 86
 October 21 – Frenchy Martin, 69
 November 18 – Ed Francis, 90
 November 28
Haruka Eigen, 70
John Cozman, 52 
 December 9 – Mario Milano, 81
 December 15 – Harley Saito, 48
 December 22 – Mocho Cota, 62

See also
List of GFW events and specials
List of NJPW pay-per-view events
List of ROH pay-per-view events
List of TNA pay-per-view events
List of WWE Network events
List of WWE pay-per-view events

References

 
professional wrestling